Saboor Aly (born 3 March 1995) is a Pakistani actress who appears in Urdu television. The younger sister of actress Sajal Aly, she began her acting career with a family drama Mehmoodabad Ki Malkain (2011). Aly garnered recognition with a comic role in sitcom Mr. Shamim (2015). She continued playing supporting roles in several serials, and made her film debut with a romantic-comedy Actor in Law (2016), for which she earned a Lux Style Award for Best Supporting Actress nomination.

She has since portraying leading roles in dramas, such as Mere Khudaya (2018), Gul-o-Gulzar (2019) and Fitrat (2020).

Early Life and career
Saboor Aly was born on 3 March 1995 in Lahore, Punjab, Pakistan to Syed Ali, a businessman, and Rahat, a housewife, who died of cancer in March 2017. She has an elder sister, Sajal Aly, and a younger brother, Ali Syed. Ali's father left her mother and had a second marriage. In an online interview, she said that she was "angry" on her father, but now shares a "close bond with [him]." Ali along with her family performed Umrah in 2017, a few days before her mother's death. Ali moved to Karachi in 2011 to start her professional career, but moved back to Lahore in 2015.

Aly started her career with a small role in Choti Si Kahani and followed it with a supporting role in the family drama Mehmoodabad Ki Malkain on ARY Digital in 2011, in which she appeared with her sister Sajal Aly. After that she again appeared with her sister Sajal, in an episode of Kitni Girhain Baqi Hain, an anthology series on Hum TV, and subsequently featured in the Hum TV's acclaimed romantic drama Bunty I Love You, alongside Saba Qamar. In September 2016, she made her film debut with Nabeel Qureshi's socio-comedy film Actor in Law, starring Fahad Mustafa, Mehwish Hayat and Om Puri. Her portrayal of a supportive sister of Mustafa's character earned her a Best Supporting Actress nomination at Lux Style Awards. Aly played the lead in the telefilm Nanu Aur Main (2018), which revolves around the grandfather-granddaughter relationship. The telefilm received positive reviews from the critics and public, and Aly was praised for her performance. Aly next played second-lead roles in the dramas Teri Meri Kahani and Visaal, the later of which is among the highest-rated Pakistani dramas of 2018.

Personal Life 
Saboor received her primary education from Rahim Yar Khan's Lahore Grammar School. For further education, she got admission in Punjab University, Lahore. The young actress came into this world on March 3, 1995.

Filmography

Films

Television

Special appearances

Awards and nominations

References

External links
 
 
 Official website

Living people
Pakistani television actresses
Pakistani female models
Punjabi people
21st-century Pakistani actresses
1995 births